Traditionalist conservatism, often known as classical conservatism, is a political and social philosophy that emphasizes the importance of transcendent moral principles, manifested through certain natural laws to which society should adhere prudently. Traditionalist conservatism is based on Edmund Burke's political views. Traditionalists value social ties and the preservation of ancestral institutions above excessive individualism.

The concepts of custom, convention, and tradition are heavily emphasized in traditionalist conservatism. Theoretical reason is regarded as of secondary importance to practical reason. The state is also viewed as a social endeavor with spiritual and organic characteristics. Traditionalists think that any change spontaneously arises from the community's traditions rather than as a consequence of deliberate, reasoned thought. Leadership, authority, and hierarchy are seen as natural to humans. Traditionalism arose in Europe throughout the 18th century, mostly as a reaction to the chaos of the English and French Revolutions. Traditionalist conservatism began to establish itself as an intellectual and political force in the mid-20th century.

Key principles

Religious faith and natural law 

A number of traditionalist conservatives embrace high church Christianity (e.g., T. S. Eliot, an Anglo-Catholic; Russell Kirk, a Roman Catholic). Another traditionalist who has stated his faith tradition publicly is Caleb Stegall, an evangelical Protestant. A number of conservative mainline Protestants are also traditionalists, such as Peter Hitchens and Roger Scruton, and some traditionalists are Jewish, such as the late Will Herberg, Irving Louis Horowitz, Mordecai Roshwald, and Paul Gottfried. 

Natural law is championed by Thomas Aquinas, called eternal law, in the Summa Theologiae, he reaffirms the principle of noncontradiction as being ("the same thing cannot be affirmed and denied at the same time"), Bonum precept is the first principle of that which precedes one's actions ("good is to be done and pursued and evil avoided"). The account of Medieval Christian philosophy is the appreciation of the concept of the Summum bonum or "highest good". It is only through the silent contemplation that someone is able to achieve the idea of the good. The rest of natural law was first developed somewhat in Aristotle's work, also was referenced and affirmed in the works by Cicero, and it has been developed by the Christian Albert the Great.

Tradition and custom 
Traditionalists think that tradition and custom should guide man and his worldview, as their names imply. Each generation inherits its ancestors' experience and culture, which man is able to transmit down to his offspring through custom and precedent. Edmund Burke, often recognized as the father of contemporary conservatism, noted that "the individual is foolish, but the species is wise."

This conservatism, it has been argued, is based on living tradition rather than abstract political thinking. Some have drawn a distinction between pragmatic conservatism and rational conservatism, which holds that a community with a hierarchy of power is most conducive to human happiness. Returning to pragmatic conservatism, according to Kekes, "tradition represents for conservatives a continuum enmeshing the individual and social, and is immune to reasoned critique."

Hierarchy and organic unity 
Traditionalist conservatives believe that human society is essentially hierarchical (i.e., it always involves various interdependent inequalities, degrees, and classes) and that political structures that recognize this fact prove the most just, thriving, and generally beneficial. Hierarchy allows for the preservation of the whole community simultaneously, instead of protecting one part at the expense of the others.

Agrarianism 
The countryside, as well as the values associated with it, are greatly valued (sometimes even being romanticized as in pastoral poetry). Agrarian ideals (such as conserving small family farms, open land, natural resource conservation, and land stewardship) are important to certain traditionalists' conception of rural life.

Classicism and high culture 
Traditionalists defend classical Western civilization and value an education informed by the texts of the Roman and Medieval eras. Similarly, traditionalists are classicists who revere high culture in all of its manifestations (e.g. literature, music, architecture, art and theatre).

Patriotism, localism and regionalism 
Traditionalists consider patriotism a core principle, described as a sense of devotion to one's homeland, in contrast to nationalists, who value the role of the state or nation over the local or regional community. Traditionalist conservatives believe that allegiance to a family, local community, or region is more important than any political commitment. Traditionalists prioritize subsidiarity and community closeness above the larger state, preferring the civil society of Burke's "little platoons" to the expanded state. Alternatively, nationalism can lead to jingoism, which sees the state as apart from the local community and family structure rather than as a product of both.

History

British influences 

Edmund Burke, an Anglo-Irish Whig statesman and philosopher whose political principles were rooted in moral natural law and the Western heritage, founded traditionalist conservatism. Burke believed in prescriptive rights, which he considered to be "God-given". He argued for what he called "ordered liberty" (best reflected in the unwritten law of the British constitutional monarchy). He also fought for universal ideals that were supported by institutions such as the church, the family, and the state. He was a fierce critic of the principles behind the French Revolution, and in 1790, his observations on its excesses and radicalism were collected in Reflections on the Revolution in France. In Reflections, Burke called for the constitutional enactment of specific, concrete rights and warned that abstract rights could be easily abused to justify tyranny. American social critic and historian Russell Kirk wrote: "The Reflections burns with all the wrath and anguish of a prophet who saw the traditions of Christendom and the fabric of civil society dissolving before his eyes."

Burke's influence was felt by later intellectuals and authors in both Britain and continental Europe. The English Romantic poets Samuel Taylor Coleridge, William Wordsworth and Robert Southey, as well as Scottish Romantic author Sir Walter Scott, and the counter-revolutionary writers François-René de Chateaubriand, Louis de Bonald and Joseph de Maistre were all affected by his ideas. Burke's legacy was best represented in the United States by the Federalist Party and its leaders, such as President John Adams and Secretary of the Treasury Alexander Hamilton.

Edmund Burke describes conservatism as an "approach to human affairs which mistrusts both a priori reasoning and revolution, preferring to put its trust in experience and in the gradual improvement of tried and tested arrangements."

Critics of material progress 
Three cultural conservatives and skeptics of material development, Samuel Taylor Coleridge, Thomas Carlyle, and John Henry Newman, were staunch supporters of Burke's classical conservatism.

According to conservative scholar Peter Viereck, Coleridge and his colleague and fellow poet William Wordsworth began as followers of the French Revolution and the radical utopianism it engendered. Their collection of poems, Lyrical Ballads, published in 1798, however, rejected the Enlightenment notion of reason triumphing over faith and tradition. Later works by Coleridge, such as Lay Sermons (1816), Biographia Literaria (1817) and Aids to Reflection (1825), defended traditional conservative positions on hierarchy and organic society, criticism of materialism and the merchant class, and the need for "inner growth" that is rooted in a traditional and religious culture. Coleridge was a strong supporter of social institutions and an outspoken opponent of Jeremy Bentham and his utilitarian theory.

Thomas Carlyle, a writer, historian, and essayist, was an early traditionalist thinker, defending medieval ideals such as aristocracy, hierarchy, organic society, and class unity against communism and laissez-faire capitalism's "cash nexus." The "cash nexus," according to Carlyle, occurs when social interactions are reduced to economic gain. Carlyle, a lover of the poor, claimed that mobs, plutocrats, anarchists, communists, socialists, liberals, and others were threatening the fabric of British society by exploiting them and perpetuating class animosity. A devotee of Germanic culture and Romanticism, Carlyle is best known for his works, Sartor Resartus (1833–1834) and Past and Present (1843).

The Oxford Movement, a religious movement aimed at restoring Anglicanism's Catholic nature, gave the Church of England a "catholic rebirth" in the mid-19th century. The Tractarians (so named for the publication of their Tracts for the Times) criticized theological liberalism while preserving "dogma, ritual, poetry, [and] tradition," led by John Keble, Edward Pusey, and John Henry Newman. Newman (who converted to Roman Catholicism in 1845 and was later made a Cardinal and a canonized saint) and the Tractarians, like Coleridge and Carlyle, were critical of material progress, or the idea that money, prosperity, and economic gain constituted the totality of human existence.

Cultural and artistic criticism 
Culture and the arts were also important to British traditionalist conservatives, and two of the most prominent defenders of tradition in culture and the arts were Matthew Arnold and John Ruskin.

A poet and cultural commentator, Matthew Arnold is most recognized for his poems and literary, social, and religious criticism. His book Culture and Anarchy (1869) criticized Victorian middle-class norms (Arnold referred to middle class tastes in literature as "philistinism") and advocated a return to ancient literature. Arnold was likewise skeptical of the plutocratic grasping at socioeconomic issues that had been denounced by Coleridge, Carlyle, and the Oxford Movement.  Arnold was a vehement critic of the Liberal Party and its Nonconformist base. He mocked Liberal efforts to disestablish the Anglican Church in Ireland, establish a Catholic university there, allow dissenters to be buried in Church of England cemeteries, demand temperance, and ignore the need to improve middle class members rather than impose their unreasonable beliefs on society. Education was essential, and by that, Arnold meant a close reading and attachment to the cultural classics, coupled with critical reflection. He feared anarchy—the fragmentation of life into isolated facts that is caused by dangerous educational panaceas that emerge from materialistic and utilitarian philosophies. He was appalled at the shamelessness of the sensationalistic new journalism of the sort he witnessed on his tour of the United States in 1888. He prophesied, "If one were searching for the best means to efface and kill in a whole nation the discipline of self-respect, the feeling for what is elevated, he could do no better than take the American newspapers."

One of the issues that traditionalist conservatives have often emphasized is that capitalism is just as suspect as the classical liberalism that gave birth to it. Cultural and artistic critic John Ruskin, a medievalist who considered himself a "Christian communist" and cared much about standards in culture, the arts, and society, continued this tradition. The Industrial Revolution, according to Ruskin (and all 19th-century cultural conservatives), had caused dislocation, rootlessness, and vast urbanization of the poor. He wrote The Stones of Venice (1851–1853), a work of art criticism that attacked the Classical heritage while upholding Gothic art and architecture. The Seven Lamps of Architecture and Unto This Last (1860) were two of his other masterpieces.

One-nation conservatism 
Burke, Coleridge, Carlyle, Newman, and other traditionalist conservatives' beliefs were distilled into former British Prime Minister Benjamin Disraeli's politics and ideology. When he was younger, Disraeli was an outspoken opponent of middle-class capitalism and the Manchester liberals' industrial policies (the Reform Bill and the Corn Laws). In order to ameliorate the suffering of the urban poor in the aftermath of the Industrial Revolution, Disraeli proposed "one-nation conservatism," in which a coalition of aristocrats and commoners would band together to counter the liberal middle class's influence. This new coalition would be a way to interact with disenfranchised people while also rooting them in old conservative principles. Disraeli's ideas (especially his critique of utilitarianism) were popularized in the "Young England" movement and in books like Vindication of the English Constitution (1835), The Radical Tory (1837), and his "social novels," Coningsby (1844) and Sybil (1845). His one-nation conservatism was revived a few years later in Lord Randolph Churchill's Tory democracy and in the early 21st century in British philosopher Phillip Blond's Red Tory thesis.

Distributism 

In the early 20th century, traditionalist conservatism found its defenders through the efforts of Hilaire Belloc, G. K. Chesterton and other proponents of the socioeconomic system they advocated: distributism. Originating in the papal encyclical Rerum novarum, distributism employed the concept of subsidiarity as a "third way" solution to the twin evils of communism and capitalism. It favors local economies, small business, the agrarian way of life and craftsmen and artists. Traditional communities akin to those found in the Middle Ages were advocated in books like Belloc's The Servile State (1912), Economics for Helen (1924), and An Essay on the Restoration of Property (1936), and Chesterton's The Outline of Sanity (1926), while big business and big government were condemned. Distributist views were accepted in the United States by the journalist Herbert Agar and Catholic activist Dorothy Day as well as through the influence of the German-born British economist E. F. Schumacher, and were comparable to Wilhelm Roepke's work.

T. S. Eliot was a staunch supporter of Western culture and traditional Christianity. Eliot was a political reactionary who used literary modernism to achieve traditionalist goals. Following in the footsteps of Edmund Burke, Samuel Taylor Coleridge, Thomas Carlyle, John Ruskin, G. K. Chesterton,  and Hilaire Belloc, he wrote After Strange Gods (1934), and Notes towards the Definition of Culture (1948). At Harvard University, where he was educated by Irving Babbitt and George Santayana, Eliot was acquainted with Allen Tate and Russell Kirk.

T. S. Eliot praised Christopher Dawson as the most potent intellectual influence in Britain, and he was a prominent player in 20th-century traditionalism. The belief that religion was at the center of all civilization, especially Western culture, was central to his work, and his books reflected this view, notably The Age of Gods (1928), Religion and Culture (1948), and Religion and the Rise of Western Culture (1950). Dawson, a contributor to Eliot's Criterion, believed that religion and culture were crucial to rebuilding the West after World War II in the aftermath of fascism and the advent of communism.

In the United Kingdom

Philosophers 

Roger Scruton, a British philosopher, was a self-described traditionalist and conservative. One of his most well-known books, The Meaning of Conservatism (1980), is on foreign policy, animal rights, arts and culture, and philosophy. Scruton was a member of the American Enterprise Institute, the Institute for the Psychological Sciences, the Trinity Forum, and the Center for European Renewal. Modern Age, National Review, The American Spectator, The New Criterion, and City Journal were among the many publications for which he wrote.

Phillip Blond, a British philosopher, has recently gained notoriety as a proponent of traditionalist philosophy, specifically progressive conservatism, or Red Toryism. Blond believes that Red Toryism would rejuvenate British conservatism and society by combining civic communitarianism, localism, and traditional values. He has formed a think tank, ResPublica.

Publications and political organizations 
The oldest traditionalist publication in the United Kingdom is The Salisbury Review, which was founded by British philosopher Roger Scruton. The Salisbury Reviews current managing editor is Merrie Cave.

A group of traditionalist MPs known as the Cornerstone Group was created in 2005 within the British Conservative Party. The Cornerstone Group represents "faith, flag, and family" and stands for traditional values. Edward Leigh and John Henry Hayes are two notable members.

In Europe 
The Edmund Burke Foundation is a traditionalist educational foundation established in the Netherlands and is modeled after the Intercollegiate Studies Institute. It was created by traditionalists such as academic Andreas Kinneging and journalist Bart Jan Spruyt as a think tank. The Center for European Renewal is linked with it.

In 2007, a number of leading traditionalist scholars from Europe, as well as representatives of the Edmund Burke Foundation and the Intercollegiate Studies Institute, created the Center for European Renewal, which is designed to be the European version of the Intercollegiate Studies Institute.

In the United States 

The Federalists had no ties to European-style nobility, royalty, or organized churches when it came to "classical conservatism." John Adams was one of the first champions of a traditional social order.

The Whig Party had an approach that mirrored Burkean conservatism in the post-Revolutionary era. Rufus Choate argued that lawyers were the guardians and preservers of the Constitution. In the antebellum period, George Ticknor and Edward Everett were the "Guardians of Civilization." Orestes Brownson examined how America satisfies Catholic tradition and Western civilization.

An intellectual branch of early-20th-century conservatism was known as New Humanism. The Southern Agrarians, or Fugitives, were another group of traditionalist conservatives. In 1930, some of the Fugitives published I'll Take My Stand, which applied agrarian standards to politics and economics.

Following WWII, the initial stirrings of a "traditionalist movement" emerged. Certain conservative scholars and writers garnered the attention of the popular press. Russell Kirk's The Conservative Mind: From Burke to Eliot, an expansion of his PhD dissertation written in Scotland, was the book that defined the traditionalist school. Kirk was an independent scholar, writer, critic, and man of letters. He was friends with William F. Buckley, Jr., a National Review columnist, editor, and syndicated columnist. When Barry Goldwater combated the Republican Party's Eastern Establishment in 1964, Kirk backed him in the primaries and campaigned for him. After Goldwater's defeat, the New Right reunited in the late 1970s and found a new leader in Ronald Reagan.

Political organizations 
The Trinity Forum, Ellis Sandoz's Eric Voegelin Institute and the Eric Voegelin Society, the Conservative Institute's New Centurion Program, the T. S. Eliot Society, the Malcolm Muggeridge Society, and the Free Enterprise Institute's Center for the American Idea are all traditionalist groups. The Wilbur Foundation is a prominent supporter of traditionalist activities, particularly the Russell Kirk Center.

Literary 
Literary traditionalists are frequently associated with political conservatives and the right-wing, whilst experimental works and the avant-garde are frequently associated with progressives and the left-wing. John Barth, a postmodern writer and literary theorist, said: "I confess to missing, in apprentice seminars in the later 1970s and the 1980s, that lively Make-It-New spirit of the Buffalo Sixties. A roomful of young traditionalists can be as depressing as a roomful of young Republicans."

James Fenimore Cooper, Nathaniel Hawthorne, James Russell Lowell, W. H. Mallock, Robert Frost and T. S. Eliot are among the literary figures covered in Russell Kirk's The Conservative Mind (1953). The writings of Rudyard Kipling and Phyllis McGinley are presented as instances of literary traditionalism in Kirk's The Conservative Reader (1982). Kirk was also a well-known author of spooky and suspense fiction with a Gothic flavor. Ray Bradbury and Madeleine L'Engle both praised novels such as Old House of Fear, A Creature of the Twilight, and Lord of the Hollow Dark as well as short stories such as "Lex Talionis", "Lost Lake", "Beyond the Stumps", "Ex Tenebris," and "Fate's Purse." Kirk was also close friends with a number of 20th-century literary heavyweights, including T. S. Eliot, Roy Campbell, Wyndham Lewis, Ray Bradbury, Madeleine L'Engle, Fernando Sánchez Dragó, and Flannery O'Connor, all of whom wrote conservative poetry or fiction.

Evelyn Waugh, the British novelist and traditionalist Catholic, is often considered a traditionalist conservative.

See also 

 Christian democracy
 Communitarianism
 Counter-Enlightenment
 Corporatism
 Distributism
 High Tories
 Historical school of economics
 Integralism
 Localism (politics)
 Monarchism
 National conservatism
 Natural order (philosophy)
 New Humanism
 New traditionalism
 Organicism
 Paleoconservatism
 Philosophical naturalism
 Red Tory
 Regionalism
 Right-wing authoritarianism
 Royalism
 Social conservatism
 Tory
 Tory (political faction)
 Traditionalism (Spain)

References

Bibliography

Further reading

Articles 
 "Understanding Traditionalist Conservatism" by Mark C. Henrie. The New Pantagruel, formerly published in Varieties of Conservatism in America, Peter Berkowitz, Ed. (Hoover Press, 2004) .

General references 
 Allitt, Patrick (2009) The Conservatives: Ideas and Personalities Throughout American History. New Haven, CT: Yale University Press.
 Critchlow, Donald T. (2007) The Conservative Ascendancy: How the GOP Right Made Political History. Cambridge, MA: Harvard University Press.
 Dunn, Charles W., and J. David Woodard (2003) The Conservative Tradition in America. Lanham, MD: Rowman and Littlefield Publishers.
 Edwards, Lee (2004) A Brief History of the Modern American Conservative Movement. Washington, D.C.: Heritage Foundation.
 Frohnen, Bruce, Jeremy Beer, and Jeffrey O. Nelson (2006) American Conservatism: An Encyclopedia. Wilmington, DE: ISI Books.
 Gottfried, Paul, and Thomas Fleming (1988) The Conservative Movement. Boston: Twayne Publishers.
 Nash, George H. (1976, 2006) The Conservative Intellectual Movement in America since 1945. Wilmington, DE: ISI Books.
 Nisbet, Robert (1986) Conservatism: Dream and Reality. Minneapolis, MN: University of Minnesota Press.
 Regnery, Alfred S. (2008) Upstream: The Ascendance of American Conservatism. New York: Threshold Editions.
 Viereck, Peter (1956, 2006) Conservative Thinkers from John Adams to Winston Churchill. New Brunswick, NJ: Transaction Publishers.

By the New Conservatives 
 Bestor, Arthur (1953, 1988) Educational Wastelands: The Retreat from Learning in Our Public Schools. Champaign, IL: University of Illinois Press.
 Boorstin, Daniel (1953) The Genius of American Politics. Chicago: University of Chicago Press.
 Chalmers, Gordon Keith (1952) The Republic and the Person: A Discussion of Necessities in Modern American Education. Chicago: Regnery.
 Hallowell, John (1954, 2007) The Moral Foundation of Democracy. Indianapolis: Liberty Fund Inc.
 Heckscher, August (1947) A Pattern of Politics. New York: Reynal and Hitchcock.
 Kirk, Russell (1953, 2001) The Conservative Mind from Burke to Eliot. Washington, D.C.: Regnery Publishing.
 Kirk, Russell (1982) The Portable Conservative Reader. New York: Penguin.
 Nisbet, Robert (1953, 1990) The Quest for Community: A Study in the Ethics of Order and Freedom. San Francisco: ICS Press.
 Smith, Mortimer (1949) And Madly Teach. Chicago:Henry Regnery Co.
 Viereck, Peter (1949, 2006) Conservatism Revisited: The Revolt Against Ideology. New Brunswick, NJ: Transaction Publishers.
 Vivas, Eliseo (1950, 1983) The Moral Life and the Ethical Life. Lanham, MD: University Press of America.
 Voegelin, Eric (1952, 1987) The New Science of Politics: An Introduction. Chicago: University of Chicago Press.
 Weaver, Richard (1948, 1984) Ideas Have Consequences. Chicago: University of Chicago Press.
 Wilson, Francis G. (1951, 1990) The Case for Conservatism. New Brunswick, NJ: Transaction Publishers.

By other traditionalist conservatives 
 Dreher, Rod (2006) Crunchy Cons: How Birkenstocked Burkeans, Gun-loving Organic Farmers, Hip Homeschooling Mamas, Right-wing Nature Lovers, and Their Diverse Tribe of Countercultural Conservatives Plan to Save America (or At Least the Republican Party). New York: Crown Forum.
 Frohnen, Bruce (1993) Virtue and the Promise of Conservatism: The Legacy of Burke and Tocqueville. Lawrence, KS: University Press of Kansas.
 Henrie, Mark C. (2008) Arguing Conservatism: Four Decades of the Intercollegiate Review. Wilmington, DE: ISI Books.
 Kushiner, James M., Ed. (2003) Creed and Culture: A Touchstone Reader. Wilmington, DE: ISI Books.
 MacIntyre, Alaisdar (1981, 2007) After Virtue: A Study in Moral Theory. Notre Dame, IN: University of Notre Dame Press.
 Panichas, George A., Ed. (1988) Modern Age: The First Twenty-Five Years: A Selection. Indianapolis: Liberty Fund, Inc.
 Panichas, George A. (2008) Restoring the Meaning of Conservatism: Writings from Modern Age. Wilmington, DE: ISI Books.
 Scruton, Roger (1980, 2002) The Meaning of Conservatism. South Bend, IN: St. Augustine's Press.
 Scruton, Roger (2012) Green Philosophy: How to Think Seriously About the Planet. Atlantic Books

About traditionalist conservatives 
 Duffy, Bernard K. and Martin Jacobi (1993) The Politics of Rhetoric: Richard M. Weaver and the Conservative Tradition. Santa Barbara, CA: Greenwood Press.
 Federici, Michael P. (2002) Eric Voegelin: The Restoration of Order. Wilmington, DE: ISI Books.
 Gottfried, Paul (2009) Encounters: My Life with Nixon, Marcuse, and Other Friends and Teachers. Wilmington, DE: ISI Books.
 Kirk, Russell (1995) The Sword of Imagination: Memoirs of a Half-Century of Literary Conflict. Grand Rapids, MI: William B. Eerdman's Publishing Co.
 Langdale, John., (2012) Superfluous Southerners: Cultural Conservatism and the South, 1920–1990. Columbia, MO: University of Missouri Press.
 McDonald, W. Wesley (2004) Russell Kirk and the Age of Ideology. Columbia, MO: University of Missouri Press.
 Person, James E., Jr. (1999) Russell Kirk: A Critical Biography of a Conservative Mind. Lanham, MD: Madison Books.
 Russello, Gerald J. (2007) The Postmodern Imagination of Russell Kirk. Columbia, MO: University of Missouri Press.
 Scotchie, Joseph (1997) Barbarians in the Saddle: An Intellectual Biography of Richard M. Weaver. New Brunswick, NJ: Transaction Publishers.
 Scotchie, Joseph (1995) The Vision of Richard Weaver. New Brunswick, NJ: Transaction Publishers.
 Scruton, Roger (2005) Gentle Regrets: Thoughts From A Life London: Continuum.
 Stone, Brad Lowell (2002) Robert Nisbet: Communitarian Traditionalist. Wilmington, DE: ISI Books.
 Wilson, Clyde (1999) A Defender of Conservatism: M. E. Bradford and His Achievements. Columbia, MO: University of Missouri Press.

Conservatism
Conservatism in the United States
Conservatism in the United Kingdom
Criticism of rationalism
Counter-Enlightenment
Toryism
Tradition
Right-wing ideologies